Hong Hyun-bin(born August 29, 1997) is an outfielder for the Sangmu Phoenix of the KBO Futures League. He graduated Yushin High School.

References

External links 
 Hyun-bin Hong on Baseball Reference

1997 births
Baseball outfielders
KT Wiz players
Living people
South Korean baseball players
People from Suwon
Sportspeople from Gyeonggi Province